Fiskville is an unincorporated community in Union Township, Montgomery County, in the U.S. state of Indiana.

It is located within the city limits of Crawfordsville.

Geography

References

Unincorporated communities in Montgomery County, Indiana
Unincorporated communities in Indiana